The 1853 Philadelphia mayoral election saw the reelection of Charles Gilpin to a fourth consecutive term.

This would ultimately be the last mayoral election before Philadelphia's county-city consolidation. It would also be the last held for a single-year term as Philadelphia mayor.

Electoral system
Beginning in 1839, the city operated under a mixed electoral system. Citizens voted for mayor in a general election. If a candidate receive a majority of the vote, they would be elected mayor. However, if no candidate received a majority, the City Council would select a mayor from the top-two finishers.

Results

References

1853
Philadelphia
Philadelphia mayoral
19th century in Philadelphia